Banks are financial institutions.

Banks or The Banks may also refer to:

Places

Australia
 Banks, Australian Capital Territory, a suburb of Canberra
 County of Banks, Queensland
 Division of Banks, an electoral district in New South Wales
 Moa Island (Queensland) or Banks Island

Canada
 Banks Island, one of the Canadian Arctic islands
 Banks Island (British Columbia)
 Banks Peninsula (Nunavut)

New Zealand
 Banks Peninsula, South Island, New Zealand

United Kingdom
 Banks, Cumbria, a village
 Banks, Dumfries and Galloway, a location
 The Banks, Greater Manchester, a location
 Banks, Lancashire, a village
 The Banks, Wiltshire

United States
 Banks, Alabama
 Banks, Arkansas
 Banks County, Georgia
 Banks, Idaho
 Banks, Oregon
 The Banks, Cincinnati, a development project in Cincinnati, Ohio
 Banks Township (disambiguation)

Vanuatu
 Banks Islands, Vanuatu

Other uses
 Banks (album), a 2012 album by Paul Banks
 Bank (geography), the land alongside a body of water
 Banks (given name)
 Banks (surname), a surname (and list of people and fictional characters with the name)
 Banks (singer) (born 1988), American singer
 Banks', a brand of Marston's Brewery
 Banks Barbados Brewery

See also
 Bank (disambiguation) 
 Lists of banks